Chrissie Viljoen (born 11 September 1976) is a road cyclist from South Africa. She represented her nation at the 2005, 2006 and 2008 UCI Road World Championships.

References

External links
 profile at Procyclingstats.com

1976 births
South African female cyclists
Living people
Place of birth missing (living people)
21st-century South African women